The Second Shot (1923 film)
 The Second Shot (1943 film)